Castel di Tora is a  (municipality) in the Province of Rieti in the Italian region of Lazio, located about  northeast of Rome and about  southeast of Rieti.

Castel di Tora borders the following municipalities: Ascrea, Colle di Tora, Pozzaglia Sabina, Rocca Sinibalda, Varco Sabino. It is located on the shores of Lake Turano.

Sights include the pentagonal tower of the former castle, the hermitage of San Salvatore, and the sanctuary of Santa Anatolia.

References

External links
 Official website

Cities and towns in Lazio